Michael Anthony Klass (born 9 February 1999) is an English professional footballer who plays as a midfielder for Aldershot Town.

Club career

Southend United
Klass joined Southend United in July 2017, following his release from Queens Park Rangers. He went onto make his first-team debut during their EFL Trophy tie against Gillingham, replacing Dru Yearwood in the 2–1 defeat.

On 2 August 2019, Klass joined National League side Bromley on a one month loan, which was later extended until January 2020.

Non-League
He was released by Southend in the summer of 2021 and he subsequently joined Isthmian League Premier Division side Lewes on a free transfer.

On 29 July 2022, Klass made the step back up to the National League to join Aldershot Town having spent pre-season with the club on trial. On 24 September 2022, Klass returned to Lewes on loan.

Career statistics

References

External links

Michael Klass at southendunited.co.uk

1999 births
Living people
Footballers from Hammersmith
English footballers
Association football midfielders
Southend United F.C. players
Bromley F.C. players
Lewes F.C. players
Aldershot Town F.C. players
English Football League players
National League (English football) players
Isthmian League players